Domhnall Ó Cobhthaigh (died 1446) was an Irish poet.

A brother of Maeleachlainn Ó Cobhthaigh (died 1429) and a son of An Clasach Ó Cobhthaigh (died 1415), Ó Cobhthaigh was a member of a hereditary bardic family. However, he was also famous as a soldier. One of his surviving poems,  T'aire riot, a mheic Mhurchaidh – addressed to the Mac Murchadha Caomhánach – urges the men of Leinster to resist the Anglo-Irish.

He was killed, along with his two sons, on the island of Cróinis on Lough Ennell, by Art Ó Mael Sheachlainn and the sons of Fiacha Mag Eochagáin.

References

 Ó Cobhthaigh family, pp. 435–436, in Oxford Dictionary of National Biography, volume 41, Norbury-Osbourne, September 2004.

Medieval Irish poets
1446 deaths
Irish soldiers
People from County Westmeath
15th-century Irish poets
Year of birth unknown
15th-century soldiers
Irish male poets
Irish-language writers